James McEvoy may refer to:

James McEvoy (teacher) (1930–2007), English educationist
James McEvoy (philosopher) (1943–2010), Irish philosopher

See also
James McAvoy (born 1979), Scottish actor